Alan McGowan may refer to:
 Alan McGowan (Australian footballer) (1926−2019), Australian rules footballer
 Alan McGowan (rugby union) (born 1972), Irish rugby union player